David William Doeren (born December 3, 1971) is an American football coach who is currently the head football coach at North Carolina State University, a position he has held since the 2013 season. Doeren previously served as the head football coach at Northern Illinois University from 2011 to 2012 and has been an assistant at the University of Wisconsin–Madison, University of Kansas, University of Montana, and University of Southern California.  He played college football at Drake University, where he also held his first assistant coaching position.

Biography
Doeren is married with three children. He is a native of Shawnee, Kansas and attended Drake University, where he played on the football team.

Coaching career
Doeren's first coaching job was as wide receivers and defensive line coach at Shawnee Mission Northwest High School in Shawnee, Kansas.

College assistant
From there he served as linebackers coach and defensive coordinator of the Drake Bulldogs. Later he became a graduate assistant with the USC Trojans before being named secondary coach of the Montana Grizzlies, where he was a member of the 2001 national championship team.  Doeren was linebackers coach with the Kansas Jayhawks from 2002 to 2005 before becoming linebackers coach and co-defensive coordinator of the Wisconsin Badgers. He was given the sole title of defensive coordinator in 2008.

Northern Illinois
On December 13, 2010, he was named the new head coach of the NIU Huskies.

2011 season
Doeren led the Huskies to a Mid-American Conference Championship and a win in the GoDaddy.com Bowl in his first year.

2012 season
On November 30, 2012, the Huskies won a second consecutive MAC Championship and become the first MAC team to earn a BCS bid with a trip to the 2013 Orange Bowl. Doeren did not coach the Huskies in the Orange Bowl, which NIU lost to Florida State, as he had already accepted the head coaching position at NC State. Doeren's salary per year was raised to $420,000 in 2012 and he was under contract at NIU until 2017.

NC State
On December 1, 2012, athletic director Debbie Yow announced that Doeren would be the new head coach of the Wolfpack.

In his first season at the helm, the Wolfpack compiled a record of 3–9 and failed to win an ACC game. In his second season, they improved to 8–5 (one of the fastest turnarounds in school history), and won the 2014 St. Petersburg Bowl. They also posted a decisive 35–7 win against archrival North Carolina.  Doeren accomplished all this with the third youngest team in the nation.

Through 2022, his Wolfpack teams have had eight seasons with winning records out of ten seasons and have been invited to eight bowl games.

Head coaching record

* Did not coach bowl game

Notes

References

External links
 NC State profile
 Northern Illinois profile

1971 births
Living people
American football tight ends
Drake Bulldogs football coaches
Drake Bulldogs football players
Kansas Jayhawks football coaches
Montana Grizzlies football coaches
NC State Wolfpack football coaches
Northern Illinois Huskies football coaches
USC Trojans football coaches
Wisconsin Badgers football coaches
High school football coaches in Kansas
People from Shawnee, Kansas
Sportspeople from the Kansas City metropolitan area
Coaches of American football from Kansas
Players of American football from Kansas